Alyona Alekhina (born 19 June 1988) is a Russian-American retired professional snowboarder who is now a singer, songwriter, musician and model. She was a seven-time national Russian snowboarding champion and two-time champion of Europe, however she injured her spinal cord in 2013 and became paralyzed.

Biography 
Alyona Alekhina was born in Moscow and grew up with an interest in sport and an active and extreme way of life. She tried different sports activities from gymnastics and skateboarding to, finally, snowboarding.

When Alekhina was 17, Roxy became her first sponsor. She was preparing to participate in the 2014 Winter Olympics in Sochi, Russia, however in April 2013 Alekhina suffered a severe spinal cord injury while shooting a Quicksilver commercial at the Mammoth Mountain Ski Resort in California. She was paralyzed from the waist down. She had several surgeries and continues rehabilitation therapy.

Alekhina is involved in a range of different projects such as music, modeling and charitable work. She is also a brand ambassador for makeup, watch and fashion brands such as Estée Lauder and Bomberg. As a musician, she is known for her singles “Tired”, “Coffee Thoughts” and “Time (Lights On The Balcony)”.

Personal life 
Alekhina met Ryan Key, the front man of the band Yellowcard, in 2012 and the couple became engaged the same year. They married in 2013, a month after Alekhina's accident; the wedding ceremony was held in the hospital intensive care unit. The marriage ended in divorce.

References

1988 births
Living people
Russian female snowboarders
Russian women singer-songwriters
Russian women singers
Russian women musicians
Russian female models
Russian expatriates in the United States
Russian expatriate sportspeople in the United States
American women singer-songwriters
Sportspeople from Moscow
21st-century American women